The Van Lynden van Sandenburg cabinet was the cabinet of the Netherlands from 20 August 1879 until 23 April 1883. The cabinet was formed by Independent Conservatives (Ind. Con.), Independent Liberals (Ind. Lib.), Independent Catholics (Ind. Cat.) and Independent Protestants (Ind. Prot.) after the election of 1879. The centre-right cabinet was a majority government in the House of Representatives. Independent Protestant Christian Democrat Theo van Lynden van Sandenburg was Prime Minister.

Cabinet Members

 Resigned.
 Served ad interim.
 Appointment: Theo van Lynden van Sandenburg appointed Minister of Finance.

References

External links
Official

  Kabinet-Van Lynden van Sandenburg Parlement & Politiek

Cabinets of the Netherlands
1879 establishments in the Netherlands
1883 disestablishments in the Netherlands
Cabinets established in 1879
Cabinets disestablished in 1883